Rolf Ineichen (born 2 May 1978) is a Swiss racing driver who currently competes in the GT World Challenge Europe and the ADAC GT Masters.

Career

Business ventures
Ineichen serves on the board of directors at OTTO'S AG, a Swiss discount department store chain, as well as Proresa SA, a Swiss real estate corporation.

Racing

Ineichen began his professional racing career in 2009, competing in a one-off event for ARAXA Racing in the Porsche Carrera Cup Germany. After a three year hiatus, he returned to compete with Stadler Motorsport at the Dubai 24 Hour, finishing sixth overall. 

The following year, Ineichen began competing full time for the first time in his career, driving for Konrad Motorsport in the exclusively-Amateur B Class of the Porsche Carrera Cup Germany. In his inaugural full-time year of competition, Ineichen scored the class championship, winning eight of 17 races. In 2014, Ineichen won the class title for the second consecutive season, adding a class victory with Stadler Motorsport at the 2014 Dubai 24 Hour to his resume that same year. For the third consecutive season, in 2015, Ineichen claimed the Porsche Carrera Cup Germany B-Class title.

In 2016, Ineichen joined Grasser Racing Team for the ADAC GT Masters and Blancpain Endurance Series seasons. He would tally one victory in his opening season in the Blancpain series, taking victory at the Nürburgring with co-driver Mirko Bortolotti. 

In 2018, Ineichen was part of the Grasser Racing Team entry that won the GTD class at the 24 Hours of Daytona. The following season, Ineichen claimed his second class victory in as many seasons at Daytona, also taking class honors at the 12 Hours of Sebring.

For 2021, Ineichen joined Swiss outfit Emil Frey Racing for the 2021 GT World Challenge Europe Endurance Cup season, driving alongside Alex Fontana and Ricardo Feller in the Silver Cup class. Scoring two class victories in five races, the trio claimed the Silver Cup title that season. The following season, he took on a drive in the DTM after it transitioned to a GT3-based formula. Ineichen finished the season with just one championship point, earned by claiming the fastest lap at Spa. In June, he competed at the 24 Hours of Le Mans in an LMP2 entry fielded by Team WRT.

2023 saw Ineichen return full-time to the GT World Challenge Europe Endurance Cup following his 2021 title, taking part in the Gold Cup class for Iron Lynx alongside Michele Beretta and Leonardo Pulcini. In the Sprint Cup, he joined Yuki Nemoto in Vincenzo Sospiri Racing's Silver Cup #119 entry.

Racing record

Career summary

* Season still in progress.

Complete IMSA SportsCar Championship results

Complete 24 Hours of Le Mans results

Complete Deutsche Tourenwagen Masters results
(key) (Races in bold indicate pole position; races in italics indicate fastest lap)

References

External links
Rolf Ineichen at IMSA

1978 births
Living people
Swiss racing drivers
24 Hours of Daytona drivers
WeatherTech SportsCar Championship drivers
Porsche Supercup drivers
ADAC GT Masters drivers
British GT Championship drivers
24H Series drivers
24 Hours of Spa drivers
24 Hours of Le Mans drivers
FIA World Endurance Championship drivers
Sportspeople from the canton of Lucerne
Blancpain Endurance Series drivers
Deutsche Tourenwagen Masters drivers
Emil Frey Racing drivers
W Racing Team drivers
Lamborghini Squadra Corse drivers
Iron Lynx drivers
Swiss businesspeople
Porsche Carrera Cup Germany drivers
Euronova Racing drivers